Dryden Regional Airport  is located  northeast of Dryden, Ontario, Canada.

Airlines and destinations

Accidents and incidents
On March 10, 1989, Air Ontario Flight 1363, a Fokker F28-1000 Fellowship, crashed shortly after takeoff due to ice on the wings. 24 of the 69 people on board died.

See also

Dryden Water Aerodrome

References

External links

Page about this airport on COPA's Places to Fly airport directory

Certified airports in Kenora District
Transport in Dryden, Ontario